Ngiwal  is one of the sixteen states of Palau. It has a population of 282 (census 2015) and an area of 26 km2

On June 21, 2018, Japan ambassador Toshiyuki Yamada gave Japan's multipurpose center to Ngiwal.

Geography 
Ngiwal is situated between Melekeok and Ngaraard on the north central east coast of Babeldaob Island. Ngiwal extends from the coast to the Rael Kedam and includes the drainage of the Ngeredekuu River. The Ngeredekuu has its headwaters on the forested east flanks of the Rael Kedam and flows through a large northwest to southeast trending valley. A coastal ridge lies between the Ngeredekuu Valley and a broad sandy plain along the coast. The modern village of Ngiwal is located on a broad section of coastal plain north of the point known as Bkulatabriual and comprises the traditional villages of Ngermechau (south) and Ngercheluuk. The traditional villages were relocated to the coast in the mid-nineteenth century from their positions on the lower slopes of the coastal ridge.

Presently, most of the use of the land in Ngiwal is confined to gardens surrounding the modern village. Interspersed with these kitchen gardens are stands of agroforest which include coconut, and betelnut, breadfruit, almond trees, and banana plants. In and around many of the uninhabited villages are stands of coconut and betelnut palms, and occasionally patches of irregularly attended taro swamp gardens. Except for occasional forays to hunt pigeon or harvest special plants, there is little active use of most of the interior of Ngiwal.

The state has an area of 26 km2 and is known for its beautiful beaches. To get to Ngiwal by boat it is necessary to do it at high tide, although there is a pier a couple of kilometers south of the village which can be reached at any tide. Its administrative center and main locality is Ngerkeai. 

The state has at least 2 protected areas the Ngerbekuu Nature Reserve and the Ngemai Conservation Area.

Demography 
The population of the state was 282 in the 2015 census and median age was 36.1 years. The official languages of the state are Palauan and English.

Its population was reached 223 inhabitants in 2005.2 increasing to 282 according to data from the 2015 census. Its inhabitants are mostly fishermen or public workers. There are 3 small family shops, a primary school and a library, which contains a large number of children's books, a copy of all Palauan books and some books in Japanese and Spanish.

Uongruious is the title of the traditional high chief from the state.

Political system
The state of Ngiwal, with population of less than 300, has an elected chief executive, governor. The state also has a legislature elected every two years. The state population elects one of the member in the House of Delegates of Palau.

Traditional villages 
There are at least four traditional village sites within Ngiwal, and at least two village sites are located in the Ngeredekuu Valley. The site of Old Ngiwal is located on the west facing slopes of the coastal ridge at the end of a mangrove channel on the east side of the Ngeredekuu River near to where it empties into the large, shallow bay which separates Ngiwal and Melekeok.

The traditional villages represent important symbols giving identity to families, clans and regions. Within villages are numerous stone features with historical and traditional importance. Many of the stone platforms, odesongel, serve as clan cemeteries, and other stone features serve as shrines.

The lagoon is an important resource area which was intensively exploited prehistorically. Important resources include the many species of fish. Near the traditional villages are taro swamp gardens, and surrounding most village sites are garden plots and terraced hillsides.

Education
The Ministry of Education operates public schools. Palau High School in Koror is the country's only public high school, so children from this community go there.

The Ngiwal state scholarship offers two scholarships. One for becoming a Palauian citizen, and one for a student at a college, university, or vocational school.

References

External links 
Honorary Consulate of the Republic of Palau to the UK &NI

States of Palau